Miss World Puerto Rico 2021, was the 46th edition of the Miss World Puerto Rico pageant. It was held at the Alejandro Tapia y Rivera Theatre in San Juan, Puerto Rico on April 24, 2021. Aryam Díaz Rosado of Naranjito, was crowned Miss World Puerto Rico 2021 by outgoing titleholder Daniella Rodríguez Laureano of Bayamón. Aryam Díaz Rosado is set to represent Puerto Rico at Miss World 2021 which was held at the Coca-Cola Music Hall in San Juan, Puerto Rico on March 16, 2021.

Results

Placements

Special Awards

Challenges

Beauty With a Purpose

Talent

Best Body

Top Model

Sports

Contestants 
Official 17 candidates of Miss World Puerto Rico 2021:

References

External links 

 
 Video of Miss World Puerto Rico 2021 contest (in Spanish)

2021 in Puerto Rico
2021
2021 beauty pageants
Miss Puerto Rico